The Zaatari refugee camp is a refugee camp in Jordan, located  east of Mafraq, which has gradually evolved into a permanent settlement; it is the world’s largest camp for Syrian refugees. It was first opened on 28 July 2012 to host Syrians fleeing the violence in the ongoing Syrian War that erupted in March 2011. It is connected to the road network by a short road which leads to Highway 10.

Early on, there were primarily issues with inadequate food supplies and inadequate housing. In 2013 it was reported that the camp was experiencing an increasing number of reports of crime. Demonstrations were or are used as a forum to create awareness of the conflict and to express political views against the current government led by Bashar al-Assad and the violence inflicted by the Syrian Armed Forces. Due to the maximum capacity of 60,000 refugees in March 2013 a second camp was built 20 kilometres east of Zarqa in the Marjeeb Al Fahood plains. On 5 April 2014 a riot resulted in a number of injuries to both refugees and Jordanian police. One refugee was killed by gunshot.

In 2015, filmmakers Zach Ingrasci and Chris Temple lived in Zaatari for a month, resulting in the documentary Salam Neighbor.

Demographics
Accurate counting of the number of refugees in the camp stopped during March 2013 due to the high influx of refugees that skyrocketed that month. The figures during the initial days varied slightly from day to day due to people 'escaping' or leaving the camp back to Syria, and partly due to initial over-counting. Movement out of the camp is restricted, controlled by temporary and limited permits to leave, which does not comply with the right to freedom of movement and residence within the borders of states.

Population growth

Since the opening of the refugee camp in July 2012, the camp saw a dramatic increase in its population, that made it the largest population center in Mafraq Governorate within a few months:
On 27 August 2012, the number of refugees in the camp reached 15,000 refugees, comprising about 10% of the total number of Syrian refugees in Jordan.
The camp was housing 30,000 Syrian refugees as of 6 September 2012 comprising about 30% of the total Syrian refugees in Jordan.

On 29 November 2012 the number of refugees reached 45,000, while the total number of Syrian refugees in Jordan was approximately 230,000.
On 10 January 2013 the total camp population reached 65,000 comprising 22% of the total Syrian refugees in Jordan.
On 5 February 2013 the number of refugees in the camp reached 76,000, while the total number of Syrian refugees in Jordan was more than 345,000.
In March 2013, the Syrian security forces started a large-scale security campaign in the southern regions of Syria, resulting in a significant increase in the refugees crossing the borders to Jordan. By 11 March there were more than 156,000 refugees in the camp. These estimates made Zataari possibly the fourth largest city in Jordan at the time.
On 30 April 2014, another refugee camp was opened in Azraq. All newly arrived refugees are now taken to Azraq, while the number of refugees in Zaatari had steadily depleted. By September 2014, the number of refugees in Zaatari had fallen to 79,000, according to the latest figures from the UNHCR.
On 26 March 2015, the camp population was estimated at 83,000 refugees. The August 2015 estimate was about 79,900.
On 31 October 2018, the population housed about 78,357 refugees, of whom nearly 20% were under five years old. 20% of households were headed by females.

Energy

The largest solar plant ever built in a refugee camp went live on 13 November 2016, estimated to reduce annual carbon dioxide emissions from the camp by 13,000 metric tonnes per year, equivalent to 30,000 barrels of oil and saving US$5.5 million annually. The 12.9 megawatt peak solar photovoltaic plant was funded by the German government, through the KfW Development Bank at a cost of 15 million euros (US$17.5 million). It provides families with between 12 and 14 hours electricity each day - longer than previously.

Funding, administration and services

As a host country, Jordan is estimated to spend $870 million a year supporting Syrian refugees; if treated as a traditional donor, it would have contributed 5,622% of its fair share. The camp is under joint administration of the Syrian Refugee Affairs Directorate and UNHCR. In March 2013 the UNHCR named Kilian Kleinschmidt Senior Field Coordinator of the camp; in late 2014, Hovig Etyemezian took over as camp manager. Other actors include:

Community mobilization:
Intersos is in charge of distributing "stoves for tents, blankets and winter clothes" as a part of the winterization campaign.
International Relief and Development Inc. (IRD)

Medical:
Arabian Medical Relief 
Médecins Sans Frontières (Doctors Without Borders)
International Medical Corps
French military field hospital providing a "surgical unit specialised in treating war injuries"
Moroccan military field hospital
Syrian American Medical Society (SAMS)
Italian Field Hospital
United Arab Emirates Red Crescent
Jordan Hashemite Charity Organization (JHCO)
Jordan Health Aid Society International (JHASi), Partner with UNHCR
Jordanian Red Crescent
Handicap International
IOM / International Organization for Migration Screening and Health relations with Jordanian Hospitals and Health Ministry for treatment.
IFH Noor Al-Hussein Foundation, Partner with UNHCR, UNFPA
Two clinics operated by UNFPA for primary health care and reproductive health care
WASH (Water/Sanitation/Hygiene) coordination and overall responsibility:
UNICEF

Water and sanitation facilities:
Federal Agency for Technical Relief THW constructed 160 kitchen units and 380 toilets. The THW was contracted by UNHCR.
MSB (Swedish Civil Contingencies Agency)
MercyCorps
Oxfam

Food:
World Food Programme (WFP)

Hygiene Promotion:
ACTED responsibility lies in the field of water treatment, water testing and waste management (liquid and solid).
JEN (formerly Japan Emergency NGOs)
Oxfam

Education:
UNICEF
SCJ/Save the Children - Jordan "is working to enroll children of Syrian refugees in the Zaatari Refugee Camp in schools" as a part of "the educational outreach programme".
Mercy Corps - provides non-formal and psychosocial support for children (ages 5–17) in Za'atari camp, with a specific focus on inclusive education programs for children and youth with disabilities.
UNESCO - Youth educational activities, Vocational Training and Higher Education
International Rescue Committee (IRM) is active in assessing the extent of gender based violence.
International Organization for Migration (IOM)
UNFPA (United Nations Population Fund)
Norwegian Refugee Council - provides informal education services.
Lutheran World Relief (LWR) - provides peace-building, music and arts workshops, vocational training and psychosocial support to youth aged 14–30 in the "Peace Oasis" in block 5.

Women's and Children's Protection:
International Rescue Committee(IRC) - operates four women's centres and works with UNICEF to care for unaccompanied and separated children.

Others:
World Vision International - implements projects with regard to water drainage and road construction.
International Committee of the Red Cross - traces families and relatives of refugees.

By 2016 Zaatari refugee camp was gradually moving away from a model of top-down service provision, as is usual with refugee camps administered by international humanitarian organisations. Instead, under the aegis of the UNHCR, the camp was transforming into a self-provisioning urban conglomeration, where refugees are provided with various forms of cash-based assistance and encouraged to address their own needs.

Mapping

As at March 2018, Zaatari shelters and other structures had been mapped more than 25 times using satellite imagery by UNOSAT. Zaatari is one of the first camps to be mapped in detail through OpenStreetMap.

See also

List of Syrian refugee camps in Jordan
Mrajeeb Al Fhood refugee camp
Syrians in Jordan

References

External links

UNHCR Data Portal
Al-Zaatari Camp Map by UNOSAT, accessed 2012-11-04
Zaatari reportage by Martin Edström
Lived Zaatari Project
Legal implications of long-term encampment in Zaatari

Populated places in Mafraq Governorate
Refugee camps in Jordan
Syrian refugee camps